Kadet may refer to:

 Kadet, a member of the Constitutional Democratic Party in the Russian Empire
 Kadet (TV channel), second children's channel of Medialaan-De Persgroep 
 Kadet Remaja Sekolah Malaysia, a scout-like movement organised by the Government of Malaysia as a youth organisation
 Terveet Kädet, a Finnish hardcore punk band

See also  

 Cadet (disambiguation)
 Kadets (disambiguation)
 Kadett (disambiguation)